Slavi may refer to:

 Slavi (people), common Latin and Italian term for Slavic peoples
 Il Regno de gli Slavi (1601), a historical work of Mavro Orbini
 Neozygites slavi, a microscopic fungus 
 Onchidoris slavi, a species of sea slug
 Slavi, a personal name:
 Slavi Kostenski, a Bulgarian footballer 
 Slavi Merdzhanov, a Bulgarian revolutionary
 Slavi Spasov, a Bulgarian footballer 
 Slavi Stalev, a Bulgarian footballer 
 Slavi Trifonov, a Bulgarian musician and actor
 Slavi Zhekov, a Bulgarian footballer

See also
 Slavi's Show
 Slavia (disambiguation)
 Sclavi (disambiguation)